Longframlington is a small village in Northumberland, England, located on the A697,  north-west of Morpeth and  south-east of Rothbury. 
Longframlington is a former pit village and on the site of the pit now stands Fram Park, a log cabin holiday park.
The village was previously the site of the Longframlington Music Festival.

Landmarks 
A branch of the Roman road, Dere Street, known as the Devil's Causeway, passes close by Longframlington, and the mounds visible on the Hall Hill in the angle of the Pauperhaugh and Weldon Bridge roads may be those of a Roman camp.

Embleton Hall is a country manor house which was built around 1730 and is a Grade II listed building.

Religious sites 
The church of St Mary the Virgin dates from the late 12th century and until 1891 was a chapel of ease to Felton; since that date Longframlington has been an independent parish. The church was carefully restored in the late 19th century retaining its fine Norman chancel arch.

The church is identified as being dedicated to St. Laurence on maps of Longframlington shown on website Communities.Northumberland.gov.uk (Longframlington - Ordnance maps) dated 1897 and 1920.

References

External links

 The Swarland Chronicles: Independent Online Magazine
GENUKI (Accessed: 17 November 2008) 	
Northumberland Communities (Accessed: 17 November 2008)

Villages in Northumberland